Cheating in Panorama is a 1972 Hong Kong comedy film directed by Li Han-hsiang.

The film has a theme of duplicity. Film critic Ain-ling Wong classified Cheating in Panorama as having what Chan Koonchung would describe as "slovenly aesthetics" that is of "the crude and vulgar variety".

Cast
Chen Chen
Li Han-hsiang
Alan Tang
Zhao Lei
Zhang Yang
Lee Kwan
Charlie Chin
Chiang Nan
Roy Chiao Hung
Jenny Hu

References

External links
 Cheating in Panorama on Hong Kong Cinemagic
 Cheating in Panorama on Hong Kong Movie DataBase
 

1972 films
1972 comedy films
1970s Mandarin-language films
Films directed by Li Han-hsiang
Hong Kong comedy films
1970s Hong Kong films